Bernice State Park, also called Bernice Area at Grand Lake State Park, is an  Oklahoma state park located in Delaware County, Oklahoma.  It is located near the city of Bernice, Oklahoma at the northwestern corner of Grand Lake o' the Cherokees. The park is actually across the mouth of the Neosho River from the town of Bernice.

Known as the "Crappie Capital of the World," the park also offers fishing for largemouth bass, white bass, channel catfish and bluegill. Visitors will find semi-modern RV sites and tent campsites, comfort stations with showers, boat ramp, courtesy boat dock for loading and unloading, picnic areas, playground, one mile (1.6 km) paved walking and jogging path that is handicap accessible, two wildlife watch towers, swimming and a nature center.

Nature center
The nature center has exhibits featuring indigenous wildlife. These include for example, beehives, taxidermied animals and a  aquarium. The center has a full-time naturalist onsite, and offers classroom facilities and tours.

References

External links
Bernice State Park
Map to Bernice State Park

State parks of Oklahoma
Protected areas of Delaware County, Oklahoma
Nature centers in Oklahoma